LGBT in Russia may refer to:
 LGBT rights in Russia
 LGBT history in Russia
 LGBT culture in Russia

See also 
 LGBT by country